San Acacio is an unincorporated community and a census-designated place (CDP) located in and governed by Costilla County, Colorado, United States. The population of the San Acacio CDP was 40 at the 2010 United States census. The Sanford post office (Zip Code 81151) serves San Acacio postal addresses.

History
San Acacio is located in the Rio Culebra valley of the Sangre de Cristo Land Grant which was awarded to the family of Carlos Beaubien in 1843. The San Acacio Post Office was established in 1909 and remained in operation until 1992. The community was named after Saint Acacius.

Historic buildings and landmarks

San Acacio Mission Church (Capilla de Viejo San Acacio) – Built early in the 1860s, the Mission of San Acacio is the oldest standing church in Colorado. Constructed with 24-inch adobe walls, the mission underwent extensive restoration during the 1990s. In addition to stabilizing the foundation, several wooden columns were added to the interior to take the weight of the roof off the fragile walls. An altar screen, or retablo, was commissioned from Maria Romero Cash, a New Mexican artist specializing in religious folk art.
San Acacio Bank
Old San Acacio Cemetery – In old San Acacio there is a cemetery nicknamed Viejo Cemetery. The cemetery is located in a churchyard in Old San Acacio. The oldest marked grave in the cemetery is from 1907, and the cemetery is currently full. 
New San Acacio Cemetery – The new cemetery is located 3/4 mile south of San Acacio. It is a public cemetery, and the oldest marked grave in the cemetery is from 1906. It is currently in use.

Geography
San Acacio is located in western Costilla County in the San Luis Valley of southern Colorado. Colorado State Highway 142 runs through San Acacio, leading east  to San Luis and west  to U.S. Route 285 at Romeo.

Demographics

See also

Outline of Colorado
Index of Colorado-related articles
State of Colorado
Colorado cities and towns
Colorado census designated places
Colorado counties
Costilla County, Colorado

References

External links

Capilla de Viejo San Acacio  @ History Colorado
Capilla de Viejo San Acacio  @ ColoradoEncyclopedia.org
Conejos County website

Census-designated places in Costilla County, Colorado
Census-designated places in Colorado
1850 establishments in New Mexico Territory